Yawning Glacier is in North Cascades National Park in the U.S. state of Washington, on the east slopes of Magic Mountain.

See also
List of glaciers in the United States

References

Glaciers of the North Cascades
Glaciers of Chelan County, Washington
Glaciers of Washington (state)